Łęgoń  (German: Vorwerk Langenau) is a village in the administrative district of Gmina Wschowa, within Wschowa County, Lubusz Voivodeship, in western Poland.

The village has a population of 222.

References

Villages in Wschowa County